Mangambeu is a popular musical style of the Bangangte people of Cameroon. It was popularised by Pierre Diddy Tchakounte. Today, other singers, such as Kareyce Fotso, continue to sing in this style.

Notes

References
 DeLancey, Mark W., and Mark Dike DeLancey (2000): Historical Dictionary of the Republic of Cameroon (3rd ed.). Lanham, Maryland: The Scarecrow Press.

Cameroonian styles of music